Social Democracy was a Mexican political party formed in June 1999 and disbanded after the 2000 federal elections.

In the 2 July 2000 presidential elections its candidate, Gilberto Rincón Gallardo, won 1.6% of the popular vote. In the senatorial elections of the same date the party won 1.8% but no seats in the Senate of Mexico. Since it did not secure 2.0% percent of the national vote it lost its conditional recognition by the Federal Electoral Institute (IFE).

In 2003 its most visible leaders could not reorganize its former members under the Party of the Rose (Partido de la Rosa). After failing to regain the federal recognition, most of them migrated to different parties of the center-left such as México Posible, Fuerza Ciudadana, Convergencia and the Social Democratic and Peasant Alternative Party.

Among its most prominents members were Gilberto Rincón Gallardo, Ricardo Raphael and Patricia Mercado.

See also
List of political parties in Mexico
Politics of Mexico

External links
Snapshots of its official webpage from the Internet Archive
La Jornada: Los chiquillos también lloran (in Spanish).

Socialist parties in Mexico
Political parties established in 1999
Political parties disestablished in 2000
Defunct political parties in Mexico
Social democratic parties in Mexico
1999 establishments in Mexico
2000 disestablishments in Mexico